John S. (Jack) Belrose (born 24 November 1926), is a Canadian radio scientist.

He was born in the small town of Warner, Alberta. He attended the University of Cambridge, where he was awarded a PhD in 1958. He has worked for the Defence Research Telecommunications Establishment (DRTE) for 33 years. He is a member of the Canadian Amateur Radio Hall of Fame and, along with Walter Cronkite, was awarded the Radio Club of America's Armstrong Medal on 16 November 2007.

References

External links
Remembrances of a Radio Scientist - Belrose's report on his 50th anniversary of working in the field of radio science.
The Sounds of a Spark Transmitter Telegraphy and Telephony - a paper by Jack Belrose.
Profile of Jack Belrose

1926 births
Possibly living people
Canadian engineers
Alumni of the University of Cambridge
Canadian expatriates in the United Kingdom